The second season of the Australian drama television series Love Child, began airing on 5 May 2015 on the Nine Network. The season concluded on 23 June 2015. It consisted of 8 episodes and aired on Tuesdays at 8:40pm.

Cast

Main 
 Jessica Marais as Joan Miller
 Jonathan LaPaglia as Dr Patrick McNaughton
 Matthew Le Nevez as Jim Marsh
 Mandy McElhinney as Matron Frances Bolton
 Ella Scott Lynch as Shirley Ryan
 Harriet Dyer as Patricia Saunders
 Sophie Hensser as Viv Maguire
 Gracie Gilbert as Annie Carmichael
 Miranda Tapsell as Martha Tennant

Recurring 
 Ben Toole as Pete
 Lincoln Younes as Chris Vesty
 Jessica June as Tania
 Andrew Ryan as Simon Bowditch 		
 Marshall Napier as Greg Matheson 		
 Ian Bolt as Bob Flannery
 Maya Stange as Eva McNaughton

Episodes

References 

2015 Australian television seasons